Paint Your Wagon is the second studio album by British rock band Red Lorry Yellow Lorry, and was released in 1986 in the UK on the independent label Red Rhino. It was the band's final original LP release on the label (outside of a singles collection,  Smashed Hits, the following year) before signing to major label Situation Two in 1987. Like their first album Talk About the Weather, Paint Your Wagon had a very short running time at under 30 minutes. Two of the tracks, "Mescal Dance" and "Blitz", were instrumentals. Initial copies came with a limited edition seven-inch single with the tracks "Paint Your Wagon" and "More Jipp".  Cassette and CD releases/reissues have featured various additional bonus tracks.

Track listing
 "Walking on Your Hands"  – 2:40
 "Jipp"  – 3:00
 "Last Train"  – 2:21
 "Head All Fire"  – 2:40
 "Mescal Dance"  – 2:42
 "Shout at the Sky"  – 3:04
 "Which Side"  – 2:07
 "Tear Me Up"  – 2:31
 "Save My Soul"  – 2:44
 "Blitz"  – 3:50

All tracks were written by Chris Reed and David Wolfenden, except for "Head All Fire", "Tear Me Up" and "Save My Soul", written by Reed.

Personnel
Chris Reed - vocals, guitar
David Wolfenden - guitar
Leon Phillips - bass guitar
Chris Oldroyd - drums

References

Red Lorry Yellow Lorry albums
1986 albums